The Warratahs are a band from Wellington, New Zealand.

Band members

Early line-ups 
 Barry Saunders (vocals/guitar)
 Wayne Mason (keyboards/vocals)
 Nik Brown (fiddle)
 John Donahue (bass)
 Marty Jorgensen (drums)
 Clinton Brown (bass)
 Rob Clarkson (drums)
 Mike Knapp (drums)

2007 line-up 
 Barry Saunders (vocals/guitar)
 Alan Norman (keyboards & accordion)
 Nik Brown (fiddle & mandolin)
 Mo' Newport (drums)
 Sid Limbert – (bass)

Discography

Compilation appearances
The group have appeared on a few compilations since their inception. The following is a list of these albums that have featured tracks by the Warratahs.

 Godzone Beat (1988, Warrior Records) – "Maureen"
 New Zealand: Our Land, Our Music (1995, EMI) – "Cruisin' on the Interislander"
 Pagan Gold (2001, Pagan Records) – "Maureen"
 The Very Best of Kiwi Country (2001, EMI) – "Hand of My Heart" and "Maureen"

Featured appearances
The Warratahs have also appeared on albums recorded by other artists. The following is a list of albums by other artists that the Warratahs have appeared on.

 The Gypsy Pickers and Friends (2004) by the Gypsy Pickers (Rimu Records) – "West Coast Bound"

References

New Zealand rock music groups
People from Wellington City